Chest is the third album by the Nels Cline Trio and the first release on Little Brother Records.

The album was recorded in June 1993 at Sage & Sound by Geoff Sykes (except "Beardism/Call Crouch" and "Power Ballad for Woodward A." which were recorded July 11, 1995 at New Zone Studio by Wayne Peet); however it was released only in 1996, as Nels Cline thought it too extreme for his label at the time, Enja. The artwork is by Carole Kim.

Track listing
 "Intro: Chant for the Road"
 "Beardism / Call Crouch"
 "Coastal Scrub"
 "Power Ballad for Woodward A."
 "The Rite (for Ingrid Thulin)"
 "Bath"
 "Sister Hotel"
"Room"
"Ties"
"Curtains"
"Down Elevator"
 "Hands of the Puppeteer" (bonus track on double vinyl)
 "Min Tao (for Paul Motian)"
 "The Gamine"

Personnel
 Nels Cline - Guitars
 Bob Mair - Bass Guitars
 Michael Preussner - Drum Set

Nels Cline Trio albums
1996 albums